Tell Me Why is a companion album to Australian singer songwriter Archie Roach's memoir of the same name. It was released on 1 November 2019. The album re-imagines 11 songs that have defined Roach's career, together with two songs that were written and never recorded, two songs of early influence, and three brand new recordings.

It was nominated for Album of the Year at the 2020 National Indigenous Music Awards. At the ARIA Music Awards of 2020, the album was nominated for three categories and Roach won both Best Male Artist and Best Adult Contemporary Album. He was also inducted into the ARIA Hall of Fame.

Singles
The album's lead single "Open Your Eyes" was released on 27 September 2019. The song is the first song Roach ever penned but remained unrecorded. Roach wrote "Open Your Eyes" in the late 1970s during a stint in rehab at Galiamble, a Men's Alcohol and Drug Recovery Centre in St Kilda. Roach said "I was about 19 or 20 years old. During whatever free time I had outside of our chores and the AA meetings, I would have with me a guitar, a pen and a notebook. One time, as I started writing what I thought was a poem, having always loved poetry, I looked down at the words: 'At fifteen I left my home, looking for the people I call my own, but all I found was pain and strife'. I realised then that writing and words, poetry and prose, has a rhythm to it. I picked up the guitar and started strumming and – bang – it just came, the melody and the rhythm and everything, all at once."

On 1 November 2019, "Rally Round the Drum" was released. The song was co-written with Paul Kelly when they toured New Zealand together in the early 1990s. Now, these two giants of Australian music reunite to finally record the song together.

Track listing

Charts

Release history

References

2019 albums
Archie Roach albums
ARIA Award-winning albums